The men's tournament was won by the team representing .

Medal Round

Classification 5-8

Classification 9-12

Ranking

References

Men